Nguyễn Hoàng Ngân (born October 21, 1984) is a Vietnamese karateka competing in the women's kata event. She won the gold medal in the women's kata event at the 2008 World Karate Championships in Tokyo, Japan. She is also a two-time silver medalist at the Asian Games.

References

External links

1984 births
Asian Games medalists in karate
Asian Games silver medalists for Vietnam
Competitors at the 2003 Southeast Asian Games
Competitors at the 2005 Southeast Asian Games
Competitors at the 2007 Southeast Asian Games
Competitors at the 2009 Southeast Asian Games
Competitors at the 2013 Southeast Asian Games
Competitors at the 2009 World Games
Competitors at the 2013 World Games
Karate coaches
Karateka at the 2006 Asian Games
Karateka at the 2014 Asian Games
Living people
Medalists at the 2006 Asian Games
Medalists at the 2014 Asian Games
Southeast Asian Games gold medalists for Vietnam
Southeast Asian Games silver medalists for Vietnam
Southeast Asian Games medalists in karate
Sportspeople from Hanoi
Vietnamese female karateka
World Games medalists in karate
World Games gold medalists
20th-century Vietnamese women
21st-century Vietnamese women